Ghazni Airport is located in Ghazni, Afghanistan, next to the main Ghazni-Kandahar Highway. It serves the population of Ghazni and other nearby Afghan provinces. The airport is mainly used for civilian flights and is still being developed as of late 2013.

History
It was formerly a military airfield until the Afghan government recently decided to turn it into an international airport.

The government plans to add two runways in the near future. The overall project is expected to be completed in 2014. The first phase of the project was inaugurated in late December 2013 after a smaller private aircraft landed at the runway of Ghazni Airport.

See also
 List of airports in Afghanistan

References

External links 
 
 Airport record for Ghazni Airport at Landings.com

Airports in Afghanistan
Ghazni Province
Installations of the United States Air Force in Afghanistan
War in Afghanistan (2001–2021)